is a train station in Okuizumo, Nita District, Shimane Prefecture, Japan.

Lines 
West Japan Railway Company

 Kisuki Line

Adjacent stations 

Railway stations in Japan opened in 1949
Railway stations in Shimane Prefecture